The B platform is an automobile platform for compact and subcompact cars of the Renault-Nissan Alliance since 2002.

Nissan-Renault
The B-segment B platform was developed through a Nissan led project as a common platform for the Renault-Nissan Alliance. As of 2010, the next generation of this platform has been renamed V platform.
 Nissan Cube
 Nissan Micra (K12)
 Renault Captur
 Renault Clio III
 Renault Clio IV
 Renault Modus
 Renault Wind
 Renault Zoe
 Nissan Bluebird Sylphy (G11)
 Nissan Livina (L10/L11)
 Nissan Note (E11)
 Nissan NV200
 Nissan Tiida/Versa (C11)
 Nissan Wingroad (Y12)
 Nissan Juke/Infiniti ESQ

Renault/Dacia B0 platform
A version with long wheelbase, named B0 platform since 2004, and developed by Renault/Dacia.
 Dacia Logan
 Dacia Sandero
 Dacia Duster (HS)
 Nissan Terrano (D15) (Russia)
 Renault Arkana (Russia)
 Renault Captur/Kaptur (Global Access)
 Nissan Kicks (D15)

The B0 platform used by AvtoVAZ for:
 Lada XRAY
 Lada Largus
 Chevrolet Niva concept
The B0 platform used by Mahindra & Mahindra for:
 Mahindra Verito Vibe

Dacia B0+ platform
The B0+ platform is used by Dacia for:
 Dacia Duster II (HM)

Dacia M0 platform
A development of the B0 platform, the M0 platform is used for the following cars:
 Dacia Dokker
 Dacia Lodgy
 Dacia Logan II
 Dacia Sandero II
 Renault Symbol III

Nissan EV platform
A new electric vehicle platform, based on the B0 platform, was revealed by Nissan in 2009, though Nissan's own documentation on the B0 platform does not mention the LEAF:
 Nissan Leaf
 Nissan e-NV200 (drivetrain, battery, electronics), body on Nissan B platform

Nissan V platform
The second generation of the B platform is now known as the V platform and used for the following cars:
 2010 Nissan Micra (K13)
 2011 Nissan Latio/Almera/Sunny/Versa (N17)
 2011 Nissan Tiida/Pulsar (C12)
 2012 Nissan Sylphy/Sentra/Pulsar (B17)
 2012 Nissan Invitation concept car
 2012 Nissan Note (E12)
 2014 Venucia R30 
 2014 Datsun Go (AD0)
 2014 Datsun Go+ (AD0)
 2018 Datsun Cross (AD0)
 2016 Nissan Kicks (P15)
 2017 Nissan Micra (K14)
 2017 Venucia D60
 2019 Nissan Almera/Versa/Sunny (N18)

References

B
B